Adalberto Arturo Rosat (January 22, 1934 – January 31, 2015) was a Roman Catholic bishop.

Ordained to the priesthood in 1958, Rosat was named bishop of the Roman Catholic Territorial Prelature of Aiquile, Bolivia, in 1987. He retired in 2009.

Notes

1934 births
2015 deaths
20th-century Roman Catholic bishops in Bolivia
21st-century Roman Catholic bishops in Bolivia
Roman Catholic bishops of Aiquile